The Fun 23 is a French trailerable sailboat, that was designed by Joubert-Nivelt for one design racing and first built in 1982. The design is out of production.

Production 
The boat was built by Jeanneau in France, Ranger Yachts in the United States and Cantiere Nautico Lillia in Italy. Jeanneau built a small number of the design, while Ranger completed about 100 examples.

Design
The Fun 23 was conceived by French sailor Alain Forgeot and became an active one-design class in Europe. The design shares a sailplan with the Soling design.

The Fun 23 is a small recreational keelboat, built predominantly of fiberglass. It has a fractional sloop rig, an internally-mounted spade-type rudder and a swing-up fin keel. It displaces  and carries  of iron ballast.

The boat is normally fitted with a small  outboard motor for docking and maneuvering.

The design has sleeping accommodation for four people, with a double "V"-berth in the bow cabin and two straight settee berths in the main cabin.

The boat has a PHRF racing average handicap of 180 with a high of 192 and low of 174.

Operational history
In a 2010 review Steve Henkel wrote, "Ranger Yachts built about 100 Fun 23's ... The French team of Joubert & Nivelt designed her ... Jeanneau in France also built a few, and an Itallian firm, Lillia, also has been a builder. Although the Fun is said to have the same sailplan as a Soling (a 27-foot one-design racing sailboat), actually the mainsails have same dimensions but the foretriangle on the Fun is much smaller than the Soling’s. There are two rigs, a short rig and a 'regular' rig ... the regular rig has a taller but still less-than-masthead jib ... she is strictly a bare-bones overnighter when it comes to accommodations."

See also
List of sailing boat types

References

Keelboats
1980s sailboat type designs
Sailing yachts
Trailer sailers
Sailboat type designs by Joubert-Nivelt
Sailboat types built by Jeanneau
Sailboat types built by Ranger Yachts
Sailboat types built by Cantiere Nautico Lillia